Bell Video Store (formerly VideoPlay.ca) was the premium Internet video-on-demand service offered by Bell Sympatico.  It had a French language equivalent, LaBanqueVideo/Boutique video Bell.  It started in Beta mode on 4 May 2007 and offered movies, television shows and music videos/concerts for $1.99 and up, with a pricing structure similar to that of iTunes by Apple Computer and Unbox by Amazon. A purchase included a full resolution video file with the rights to download on up to 4 devices. The Bell Video Store ceased operations on 15 July 2009.  Movies were not available for purchase or rent after 15 June 2009.

Compatibility
The Video Store player was compatible with the Windows XP family of operating systems and Windows Vista. The content could be viewed using the Bell Video Player, Windows Media Player, a Media Centre compatible computer and a PlaysForSure portable device (May 2008). With the Media Centre capability, content could then be streamed to a television using a Windows Media Center Extender such as an Xbox 360 console from a PC running Windows XP Media Center Edition or Windows Vista (Home Premium or Ultimate). Downloaded videos could be burned to a DVD for storage purposes, but the resulting DVD would not play on a DVD player.

Social networking
The Video Store had a social networking component, partnered with Broadband Mechanics to deliver a series of "widgets" that allowed users to interact with content on the site.
Examples of this included 5-star ratings, reviews, comments, adding friends, sending messages and more.

Video quality
The content delivered by Bell Video Store was "DVD and above quality". Bit rates ranged from 1.5 to 2.5. The encoding rate used created a file size which made one hour of programming roughly equal to one gigabyte (1 GB) of file space in a computer. In comparison, a typical DVD makes a 2-hour movie about 4.7 GB.

Due to the large size of the files being downloaded, the service required a broadband internet connection capable of sustaining transfer speeds of 800 kbit/s. A 2-hour filme might have taken 7 hours and 20 minutes to download using a 750 kbit/s DSL/cable connection or 1 hour and 50 minutes with a 3.0 Mbit/s DSL/cable connection.

For Bell Video Store users with a high speed connection, the service delivered a progressive download feature which aimed to have any Bell Video Store files playing within 5 minutes.

Requirements
For display on a computer or transfer to portable device, the service required the installation of a client application (Media Player) which managed playback and the transfer of video to devices.

Criticism
Video Store videos would only play in desktop applications that supported Windows Media DRM, of which none exist for Mac OS X and Linux.

When portable capability was launched in May 2008, the Bell Video Store only supported portable devices that supported the Microsoft PlaysForSureformat, thereby excluding popular devices such as the Apple iPod.

Bell launched this service shortly after beginning to throttle the popular bit torrent protocol. Similar services such as Azureus's Vuze & BitTorrent Inc's DNA Platform have been effectively stopped from entering this market in Canada.

Competitors
 Apple iTunes Store
 Google Video
 Xbox
 Movielink
 CinemaNow
 Vongo
 ZML
 Walmart Video Download (beta)
 Vuze

External links
Main site:  The Bell Video Store (beta) – formerly VideoPlay
 REVIEW: of Bell Video Store by Kris Abel of CTV Tech News
Update: Globe and Mail Article "Half Empty of Half Full
 BoutiqueVideoBell.ca
 Bell Introduces Videoplay.ca as a beta video download service for Canadians
   Bell Video Store featured on CTV WebMania
 Canadian Film Fest Announces Bell Video Store Award for Best Short
 Bell Video Store Launches in Canada
  Globe And Mail technology: Bell launches video download store
 Online Video Advances, Hurdles Loom – Bell Video Store and Netflix
 Bell's Small Screen Debut!
 Bell Canada Opens Online Video Store as P2p debate rages on
 Bell beats Rogers to the Punch: Launches New Video Store (news article)

Video on demand